Devon Chafa Taitamba (born 25 December 1990) is a Zimbabwean footballer who plays as a defender for Ngezi Platinum and the Zimbabwe national team.

Club career
Chafa began his career with Dynamos, his spell with Dynamos was mainly a success as he left in 2015 following four Zimbabwe Premier Soccer League medals and two Mbada Diamonds Cup medals but he did suffer a thirty-day suspension after testing positive for a banned substance by FIFA in 2013. The reasoning behind his departure in 2015 was that new Dynamos manager David Mandigora did not renew his contract. After leaving in 2015, Chafa signed for How Mine with whom he remained with until 2016 when he joined CAPS United. He left CAPS in December 2017.

Two months later, Chafa signed for Zambian Premier League side Buildcon. Buildcon released Chafa in August 2018. He returned to Zimbabwe with Platinum a month later. 2020 saw Chafa join Ngezi Platinum.

International career
Chafa's first two competitive international caps came in qualifying for the 2014 FIFA World Cup against Egypt and Guinea.

Personal life
During the COVID-19 pandemic, Chafa was accused on breaking lockdown rules by playing local "money games" with amateur footballers in Budiriro. Chafa denied these claims, though his Ngezi Platinum manager Rodwell Dhlakama publicly condemned him for the games.

Career statistics
.

Honours
Dynamos
Zimbabwe Premier Soccer League (4): 2011, 2012, 2013, 2014
Mbada Diamonds Cup (2): 2011, 2012

CAPS United
Zimbabwe Premier Soccer League: 2016

Platinum
Zimbabwe Premier Soccer League: 2018

External links

References

1990 births
Living people
Sportspeople from Harare
Zimbabwean footballers
Zimbabwe international footballers
Association football defenders
Zimbabwean expatriate footballers
Expatriate footballers in Zambia
Zimbabwean expatriate sportspeople in Zambia
Dynamos F.C. players
CAPS United players
How Mine F.C. players
Buildcon F.C. players
Ngezi Platinum F.C. players